Asemum striatum, the black spruce borer, is a beetle species belonging to the family Cerambycidae, subfamily Spondylidinae.

This beetle is present in most of Europe, the East Palearctic realm, the Near East, Nearctic realm, and Indomalayan realm.

Head and pronotum are usually black, while elytrae are black or brownish, with various longitudinal ridges (hence the specific name).

They are polyphagous in coniferous trees (mainly feeding on Pinus sylvestris, Pinus mugo and Pinus nigra, but also on Picea abies and Abies or Larix species). Larvae develop under bark of host plants, later in dead branches and stumps of trees.

External links
 Biolib
 Cerambycoidea
  Cerambyx
 Fauna Europaea

Spondylidinae
Beetles of Europe
Taxa named by Carl Linnaeus
Beetles described in 1758